Kadin is both a given name and a surname. Notable people with the name include:

Kadin Chung (born 1998), Canadian association football player
Heather Kadin (born 1972), American television and film producer
Mark Kadin (born 1965), Russian musical director and conductor

See also
Kaden (name)